"Good Life" is a song recorded by American rapper G-Eazy and American singer Kehlani, taken from the soundtrack for The Fate of the Furious (2017).

Music video
The accompanying music video for "Good Life" was shot in Downtown Los Angeles, it was uploaded on Kehlani's YouTube channel on March 17, 2017. Scenes from The Fate of the Furious appear in the music video featuring appearances from actors Vin Diesel, Jason Statham, Michelle Rodriguez, Kurt Russell, Scott Eastwood, Nathalie Emmanuel, Dwayne Johnson, Tyrese Gibson, Eden Estrella and Ludacris.

Charts

Weekly charts

Year-end charts

Certifications

References

2017 singles
G-Eazy songs
Kehlani songs
2017 songs
Songs written by Jason Evigan
Songs written by Skylar Grey
Songs written by DJ Frank E
Songs written by Vanessa Carlton
Songs written by Steven "Lenky" Marsden
Atlantic Records singles
Songs written by Kehlani
Songs written for films
Fast & Furious music
Songs written by Ben Billions
Songs written by G-Eazy